AQH may refer to:
American Quarter Horse
AQH share, a measurement of radio audience
Quinhagak Airport, FAA airport ID = AQH